was a Japanese politician. He served as governor of Aichi Prefecture from 1983 to 1999. He was born in Mie Prefecture. He graduated from Nagoya University. He was a recipient of the Order of the Sacred Treasure.

References

1928 births
2022 deaths
Governors of Aichi Prefecture
Recipients of the Order of the Sacred Treasure, 1st class
Nagoya University alumni
Politicians from Mie Prefecture